Talles Magno Bacelar Martins (born 26 June 2002), commonly known as Talles Magno, is a Brazilian professional footballer who plays as a winger for Major League Soccer club New York City FC. He was included in The Guardian's "Next Generation 2019".

Career statistics

Honours
Brazil U17
FIFA U-17 World Cup: 2019

New York City FC
MLS Cup: 2021
Campeones Cup: 2022

Individual
CONCACAF Champions League Best Young Player: 2022
CONCACAF Champions League Best XI: 2022

References

2002 births
Living people
Brazilian footballers
Brazil youth international footballers
Association football forwards
CR Vasco da Gama players
Campeonato Brasileiro Série A players
Footballers from Rio de Janeiro (city)
Designated Players (MLS)
New York City FC players
Brazilian expatriate footballers
Brazilian expatriate sportspeople in the United States
Expatriate soccer players in the United States
Major League Soccer players